Martine Guépin (born 15 May 1951) is a French sports shooter. She competed in the women's 25 metre pistol event at the 1988 Summer Olympics.

References

1951 births
Living people
French female sport shooters
Olympic shooters of France
Shooters at the 1988 Summer Olympics
Place of birth missing (living people)